Snowpony were a British indie rock group initially formed in 1996 by Katharine Gifford and Debbie Googe.

History
Gifford, who at the time was in Moonshake, gave Googe a tape of songs she had been working on before Moonshake went on a US tour. Googe, who then had recently left My Bloody Valentine, decided to add bass lines to the recordings. After the tour, Gifford listened to what Googe did with the songs, and they decided they wanted to play them live.  Gifford and Googe then enlisted drummer Max Corradi whom they knew from his days in Rollerskate Skinny.

Snowpony released "Easy Way Down" and "Chocolate in the Sun" on their own See No Evil label,. and Rough Trade had put out "The Little Girls Understand" as a 7" on their Singles Club.  The group then signed to Radioactive Records, and recorded their debut album The Slow Motion World of Snowpony,. with John McEntire in Chicago.

Corradi left shortly after the album's release and he was replaced by Kevin Bass.  Ex-Curve and ex-Echobelly member Debbie Smith joined on guitar before the band went on tour.

While the band recorded the follow-up Sea Shanties for Spaceships, they got into a two-year legal dispute with Radioactive, as they wanted to be released from their contract.  The band eventually put out the recording themselves under the "Dead Pan Alley" moniker on 11 September 2001.

Their last release A Fistful of Seahorses is a six-song EP was put out as an internet download in 2003, and the band split up the following year.

Discography

Albums
 The Slow Motion World of Snowpony (Aug. 25, 1998, Radioactive)
 Sea Shanties for Spaceships (2001, Dead Pan Alley)

Singles and extended plays
 "Easy Way Down" (1996, See No Evil) #192 UK
 "The Little Girls Understand" (1996, Rough Trade)
 "Chocolate in the Sun" (1997, See No Evil)
 "John Brown" (1998, Radioactive) #197 UK
 A Fistful of Seahorses (EP) (2003)

References

External links
 

Rock music supergroups
Musical groups established in 1996
Musical groups disestablished in 2004
Stereolab